Reform is a Swedish music group, that was formed in Stockholm in 1998 by Jesper Bergman, Johan Klaeson and Anders Bergman. The group started playing tunes from Miles Davis' early fusion period (1969–75), but later turned to their own material.

Members
Jesper Bergman - electric bass
Peter Åkerberg - electric guitar
Anders Bergman - drums, percussion
Thomas Berglund - electric guitar
Magnus Ramel - keyboard
Mattias Lennestig - keyboard

Former members
Álvaro Fernández Gavíria / Bill Öhrström - harmonica
Micke Hujanen - electric guitar
Johan Klaeson - electric guitar
Jonathan Hansson - electric guitar
Jonas Redmo - harmonica
Mattias Lennestig - Rhodes
Ulf Henningsson - electric guitar
Reine Fiske - electric guitar
Alexander Wiig - percussion, sitar
Isak Andersson - drums, percussion
Åke Eriksson - drums, percussion
Pedro Martínez - drums
Pitú - electric guitar
Fran Gasol - drums
Paul San Martín - piano

Discography
2001 - Easy
2003 - Concierto en Altxerri
2004 - Reduced & Maximized
2009 - Reformed
2009 - Uncut & Lo-Fi
2011 - Reveries of Reform

External links
Official Website

Jazz fusion ensembles
Swedish psychedelic rock music groups